Sydney Maxwell Carman (15 December 1901 – 16 February 1966) was an Australian rules footballer who played with Essendon in the Victorian Football League (VFL).

A centreman, Carman was the Essendon Best and Fairest winner in 1932 and also achieved Victorian interstate selection. After retiring as a player, he became club treasurer.

References

External links

1901 births
Australian rules footballers from Victoria (Australia)
Essendon Football Club players
Crichton Medal winners
1966 deaths
Place of birth missing
Place of death missing
Essendon Football Club administrators